Soest is a railway station located in Soest, Netherlands. The station was opened on 27 June 1898 on the single track Den Dolder–Baarn railway. It is the only station with two platforms on the line.

Train services
The following train services call at Soest:

Bus services

There is no bus service at this station. The nearest bus stop is in Soestdijk.

External links
NS website 
Dutch Public Transport journey planner 

Railway stations in Utrecht (province)
Railway stations opened in 1898
Railway stations on the Stichtse lijn
Soest, Netherlands